Nodar Tcheishvili is a Georgian rugby union player. He plays as lock for London Scottish F.C. in RFU Championship and the Georgian national side.

References

1990 births
Living people
Expatriate rugby union players from Georgia (country)
Expatriate rugby union players in France
Rugby union players from Georgia (country)
Georgia international rugby union players
Expatriate sportspeople from Georgia (country) in France
Cornish Pirates players
London Scottish F.C. players
The Black Lion players
Rugby union locks